was a live show performed by Japanese musician Sheena Ringo at the Kaho Theater ( in Iizuka City, Fukuoka. The event took place on July 30, 2000. The event's official name is "".

A video recording of the event was released on DVD by EMI Music Japan on September 17, 2008 as part of the celebration for the 10th anniversary of Ringo Sheena's debut.

Ticket lottery 
Due to the high demand for tickets exceeding the capacity of the Kaho Theater (a theater featuring traditional Japanese architecture with a capacity of 1,000 people), tickets for the concert were sold by lottery. The high demand for tickets resulted in many being sold at auction for a higher price. Toshiba EMI broadcast a live-stream of the performance, which was viewed by approximately 17,300 people, a new national record in Japan.

Sheena invited fans who had not managed to get tickets to play extras in the filming of the PV for Yattsuke Shigoto on July 28, where band members had a dress rehearsal before the public performance. Inspired by a rock band vocalist who told his fans to "wear black to tomorrow's show" and then did not wear black himself, Sheena asked all the guests to wear red for the day. No music was recorded during filming. The track used in the video was the recording from the performance at Shibuya Public Hall on April 15, 2000 from the "Gekokujou Xstasy" tour. Thus, at the end of the video, the beginning of another song, "Benkai Debussy", can be heard.

Performance
The show was a one-night performance that took place at the Kaho Theater in Iizuka in Fukuoka Prefecture.

The scenic design and stage effects incorporated  (the traditional sliding door of translucent paper) and other Japanese-style effects. As part of the stage performance, Sheena crucified a mannequin dressed in the image of her bandage-like costume from her previous nationwide tour "Gekokujou Xstasy." She also used similar Japanese themes in her later nationwide tour "Sugoroku Ecstasy" (which was recorded and released on DVD as "Electric Mole"). A photograph of this is exhibited in the HP of Kaho Theater.
 ""
 ""
 ""
 ""
 ""
""
 ""
 ""
 "Unconditional Love" (Cyndi Lauper cover)
 ""
 ""
 ""
 ""
 ""
 ""
 ""
 Encore
 ""

Backing band
 (1999–2000)
 Vocals, Electric guitar: 
 Electric guitar:  (1999),  (2000, Sheena's former husband)
 Electric bass guitar: 
 Synthesizer, Keyboard instrument:  (from Thinners, SPARKY)
 Drums: 
 Music sequencer:

Notes

References

Ringo Sheena video albums